Edition Wilhelm Hansen is a Danish music publishing company founded in 1857 by Wilhelm Hansen. It publishes score and recordings.

It was founded as Christiani & Grisson in 1811, and bought by printer and engraver Wilhelm Hansen in 1857, who sold it again to C.C. Lose's Musikhandel og Horneman & Erslevs Musikforlag. The earliest store was located at Kongens Nytorv in Copenhagen. It is currently owned by Wise Music Group.

References

External links
Official website

Danish companies established in 1811
Danish companies established in 1857
H
Mass media in Copenhagen
Music publishing companies
Companies based in Copenhagen
Music organizations based in Denmark
Companies based in Copenhagen Municipality